The eighth season of the reality television series Basketball Wives premiered on VH1 on June 19, 2019. The season was primarily filmed in Los Angeles, California. It was executively produced by Mark Seliga, Pam Healey, Shaunie O'Neal, Amanda Scott, and Sean Rankine. 

The show chronicles the lives of a group of women who are the wives and girlfriends, or have been romantically linked to, professional basketball players in the National Basketball Association, though the title of the series does not make this differentiation, solely referring to the women as "wives".

Production
Basketball Wives debuted on April 11, 2010, with thirty-minute episodes. The second season premiered on December 12, 2010, with expanded sixty-minute episodes and featured new cast member Tami Roman. Season 3 made its debut on May 30, 2011, with new cast member Meeka Claxton. The fourth season premiered on February 20, 2012, with two new cast members, Kenya Bell and Kesha Nichols and the departure of Claxton. The fifth season premiered on August 19, 2013, with Tasha Marbury joining the cast. According to a tweet from Tami Roman, the show has been quietly though officially cancelled.

On March 27, 2017, VH1 announced that the series would be returning after nearly four years off-air on April 17, with Evelyn Lozada, Shaunie O'Neal, Tami Roman, Jackie Christie and Malaysia Pargo returning to the franchise.

Cast

Main cast
Malaysia Pargo: Ex-Wife of Jannero Pargo
Jackie Christie: Wife of Doug Christie
Jennifer Williams: Ex-Wife of  Eric Williams
Tami Roman: Ex-Wife of Kenny Anderson
Evelyn Lozada: Ex-Fiancée of Carl Crawford
Shaunie O'Neal: Ex-Wife of Shaquille O’Neal

Recurring cast
Kristen Scott: Wife of Thomas Scott
CeCe Gutierrez: Fiancee of Byron Scott
Ogom “OG” Chijindu: Girlfriend of Kwame Alexander
Feby Torres: Ex-Girlfriend of Lance Stephenson

Guest
Dominique Lenard: Ex-Wife of Voshon Lenard
Vinessa Sacre: Wife of Robert Sacre

Episodes

References

2019 American television seasons
Basketball Wives